Addison White (May 1, 1824 – February 4, 1909) was an American politician who served the state of Kentucky in the United States House of Representatives between 1851 and 1853.

Biography

Addison White was born in Abingdon, Washington County, Virginia on May 1, 1824, to Colonel James White. The Whites were considered the "First Family" of Clay County, Kentucky. Addison's father was among the richest men in America due to his myriad business interests including salt mining which lead to his nickname "The King of Salt."

He graduated from Princeton College in 1844. In 1850, he was elected as a Whig to the U.S. House of Representatives, serving one term. Addison's 1st cousin, John White preceded his service and his nephew John D. White followed him, also representing Kentucky. He was also a cousin removed of Hugh Lawson White, Brigadier General James White, and Joseph Lanier Williams
.

After the war, he moved to Huntsville, Alabama and became a successful businessman and died there on February 4, 1909. He was buried in Maple Hill Cemetery in Huntsville.

References
 Retrieved on 2009-02-26

1824 births
1909 deaths
Princeton University alumni
Politicians from Abingdon, Virginia
Whig Party members of the United States House of Representatives from Kentucky
19th-century American politicians